The 1901 VFL Grand Final was an Australian rules football game contested between the Essendon Football Club and Collingwood Football Club, held at the Lake Oval in Melbourne on 7 September 1901. It was the 4th annual Grand Final of the Victorian Football League, staged to determine the premiers for the 1901 VFL season. The match, attended by 30,031 spectators, was won by Essendon by a margin of 27 points.

Teams

 Umpire - Henry "Ivo" Crapp

Statistics

Goalkickers

See also
 1901 VFL season

VFL/AFL Grand Finals
Grand
Essendon Football Club
Collingwood Football Club
September 1901 sports events